The Power Team is an animated series that aired as a segment of the video game reviewing show Video Power during the show's first season. While there were 33 episodes in the first season of Video Power, only 26 episodes of The Power Team were produced. As a result, some episodes of The Power Team would be aired more than once. The Power Team segments were re-edited and repackaged as a stand-alone show after Video Power underwent a format change for its second season. The Power Team was directed by Steven Martiniere and Jack Olesker was the developer and story editor. The cartoon series was produced by Bohbot Entertainment.

Overview 
The cartoon show featured characters from five different console video games published by Acclaim Entertainment. They included Max Force from NARC (originally an arcade game by Williams, ported to the NES by Rare), Kuros from the Wizards and Warriors series (originally created by Rare), Kwirk from the eponymous Game Boy title (originally by Atlus), Tyrone from Arch Rivals (originally by Midway) and Bigfoot from the game of the same name (developed by Beam Software, and based on the famous monster truck). The cartoon show also featured a cartoon version of the host of Video Power, Johnny Arcade, as they fought against villains from the Acclaim lineup, mainly Mr. Big and his henchmen Spike Rush and Joe Rockhead from NARC, although Malkil from Wizards and Warriors or Kwirk's enemies from his own game occasionally appeared as well.

The show seemed intended to capitalize on the audiences of Captain N: The Game Master, a DiC/Nintendo production but instead of  having the protagonist getting transported into an alternate world filled with video game heroes, The Power Team took the opposite tack by having the game characters come to the "real world". A common device on the show was the characters trying to recover the "game paks" from Mr. Big which would send them home. Mr. Big would actually use the Game Paks to try to blast the characters back home during their battles. The heroes' rationale was that they needed to thwart Mr. Big. In one episode where Kuros was sent home, the other teammates had been along with him, and Kuros explained that he must return to the real world as he was now part of a team, and could not go home for good until the other members could safely go home as well. During battles, Johnny would use a special communication device that looked like an NES Advantage controller to direct the Power Team members from his room.

"Radical" redesigning 
A few of the characters underwent radical redesigns from their game incarnations: Max Force, for example, looked like a SWAT officer and had a utility belt instead of machine guns, and Kuros bore more resemblance to a barbarian (as Kuros was depicted on the Wizards and Warriors box art), especially the original He-Man, than a knight in armor. Tyrone was given a small afro, likely so he wouldn't resemble Michael Jordan as much as his Arch Rivals counterpart. Mr. Big more closely resembled his game counterpart, but he didn't use a wheelchair and didn't have a "second form", instead of using cigar-related gadgets and weapons ("cigar missiles", for example). Secondary villain Malkil did not look like the stereotypical wizard of the games, although his depiction remained true to form by wearing a skullcap, robes, and a forked beard, which gave him a sinister, albeit regal appearance.

Johnny Arcade's involvement 
Before the beginning of each episode, Johnny Arcade is briefly shown playing each character's game on his NES before they come flying out of the screen. While Johnny was always leading the team, he was very rarely actually seen hanging out with the characters. He was often be in his room calling the shots. Even though Max Force does take a bit of a leader role, one episode had Mr. Big tamper with Johnny's controls making him unable to give orders.

Other villains 
While Mr. Big was the primary villain, on occasion, other villains, who were the adversaries of the other characters, would appear, such as Kwirk's enemy Rowdy Roddy Radish. Mr. Big is missing his mustache from the arcade version of his origin. The show also featured an evil living monster truck named Burnt Rubber, who acted as an adversary to Bigfoot. Outside of Mr. Big, the primary villain was Malkil, the warlock who was the main enemy of Kuros, who appeared to be far more sinister than Mr. Big and worked alone, save for one episode when Mr. Big was targeting the Power Team only to be interrupted by Malkil appearing, and both villains figured an alliance may be best to destroy the Power Team. Malkil had also figured that the team would be lost without Johnny Arcade, so at one time he transported the team members to the gothic land of Sindarin, Kuros' native land. The team learned to work without Johnny's leadership and survive in the medieval realm.

Episodes list 
"Yes We Have No Tomatoes"
"Treasure of Bangladar"
"Hooray for Hollyweird"
"New Gang in Town"
"Burnt Rubber"
"Speedway Assault"
"Turf Wars"
"Big Footenstein"
"It Came to Millburg"
"Pull the Plug"
"Deaf Ears"
"Back to the Game World"
"Tunnel Radish"
"Rigged Deal"
"Criss Cross Double Cross"
"The Day Johnny Stayed at School"
"Train Game"
"Video Virus"
"A Man and his Belt"
"Slice & Dice"
"The Bride of Mr. Big"
"Whose Game World Is This Anyway?"
"Ski Patrol"
"The Greatest Heist of All"
"The Golden Joystick"
"Bums"
"On the Ball"

References

External links 
 

Animated series based on video games
Crossover animated television series
Superhero teams
American television shows based on video games
First-run syndicated television programs in the United States
1990s American animated television series
1990 American television series debuts
1991 American television series endings
American children's animated game shows
American television series with live action and animation